Corrado Benedetti (20 January 1957 – 15 February 2014) was an Italian footballer who played as a defender.

Benedetti played for Cesena, Bologna, Perugia, Catania, Trento, Livorno, and Forlì. He died on 15 February 2014, just a few weeks after his 57th birthday.

References

1957 births
2014 deaths
Italian footballers
Bologna F.C. 1909 players
Forlì F.C. players
Benevento Calcio managers
A.C. Trento 1921 players
Association football defenders
Italian football managers